Johns (styled as johns) is a 1996 American drama film written and directed by Scott Silver and starring David Arquette and Lukas Haas, who portray hustlers who work Santa Monica Boulevard.

Plot
It's Christmas Eve and John (David Arquette) is asleep in a Los Angeles park. He awakens as someone is stealing his shoes, in which he keeps his money. He chases the thief but can't catch him. John is angered not only because those are his "lucky" sneakers but because he's trying to accumulate enough money for an overnight stay in a fancy hotel to celebrate his birthday, which is also Christmas. Each time John puts any money together, via prostitution or stealing from clients, it's taken from him either by robbery or in payback for a drug deal where he burned the dealer.

Meanwhile, Donner (Lukas Haas), a fellow hustler who's new to the streets and has fallen for John, tries to convince John to go with him to Branson, Missouri. Donner has a relative who runs a theme park there who can get them jobs. John is initially resistant to the idea but, after some particularly bad experiences, agrees to go.

John and Donner have enough money for two bus tickets to Branson but John takes one last "date" to earn money for expenses. After their sexual encounter at a motel, however, John's "date" is remorseful for having gone through with the act. He insists to John that he's not gay. John smiles and says he isn't either.  But his "date" believes that John is making a mockery of him and turns violent, beating John to death mercilessly.

Donner goes in search of John and finds him at the motel. Donner drags John's lifeless body from the bathroom to the bed and tearfully confesses that he's the one who stole John's sneakers and money in a desperate attempt to persuade John to leave town with him.

Cast
 David Arquette as John
 Lukas Haas as Donner
 Wilson Cruz as Mikey
 Keith David as Homeless John
 Christopher Gartin as Eli
 Elliott Gould as Manny Gold
 Terrence Dashon Howard as Jimmy, The Warlock
 Nicky Katt as "Mix"
 Richard Kind as Paul Truman
 John C. McGinley as Danny Cohen
 Richard Timothy Jones as Mr. Popper
 Alanna Ubach as Nikki
 Arliss Howard as John Cardoza
 Nina Siemaszko as Tiffany, The Prostitute
 Craig Bierko as Christmas Radio Preacher

Awards and nominations
 San Sebastián International Film Festival Best New Director - Scott Silver (1996)

DVD release
Johns was released on Region 1 DVD on February 29, 2000.

References

External links
 
 
 

1996 films
1996 LGBT-related films
1996 drama films
American LGBT-related films
Films about male prostitution in the United States
Films produced by Beau Flynn
1996 directorial debut films
1997 drama films
1997 films
Films with screenplays by Scott Silver
1990s English-language films
1990s American films
Crimes against sex workers in fiction